Tadepalle is a village in the mandal of Tadepalligudem mandal in the West Godavari district of the state of Andhra Pradesh in southern India.

Demographics 

 Census of India, Tadepalle had a population of 11081. The total population constitute, 5801 males and 5208 females with a sex ratio of 910 females per 1000 males. 1004 children are in the age group of 0–6 years, with sex ratio of 927 The average literacy rate stands at 76.29%.

References

Villages in West Godavari district